Macrozamia serpentina is a species of cycad in the family Zamiaceae endemic to Queensland, Australia.

References

Whitelock, Loran M. 2002. The Cycads. Portland: Timber Press.

External links
 

serpentina
Taxa named by Paul Irwin Forster
Taxa named by David L. Jones (botanist)